Manuel da Costa Soares is an East Timorese professional football manager. He had coached Timor-Leste national football team in two stints; in 2009 and in 2015.

References

Year of birth missing (living people)
Living people
East Timorese football managers
Timor-Leste national football team managers
Place of birth missing (living people)